is a Japanese actress, voice actress and singer who was born in Yokohama, Japan. Her name is also sometimes romanized as Rica Matsumoto. She was one of the founders of the  anison band JAM Project.

After early stage work, she began both voice acting and singing careers. The most popular role by Rica is Satoshi (Ash Ketchum in English translations), the original main character of the anime series Pokémon. She also had a role in the Yu-Gi-Oh series as Ryo Bakura and Yami Bakura. As such, Matsumoto has taken on roles for young boys. Matsumoto also performs the songs for many of the openings for the Japanese Pokémon anime.

Matsumoto has had lead or supporting roles in dozens of series. She has also had a radio show in Japan and does some dubbing work for translations of American films and TV series into Japanese. She announced in April 2008 she was taking time off from the group and her solo work.

Filmography

Television animation

Original video animation (OVA)
Moldiver (1993) - Nozomu Ozora
Dirty Pair Flash (1994-1996) - Kei
Phantom Quest Corp (1994-1995) - Ayaka Kisaragi
Ruin Explorers (1995-1996) - Rasha
Miyuki-chan in Wonderland (1995) - Sumire-chan
Magical Girl Pretty Sammy (1995) - Chihiro
Fake (1996) - Bikky
Shamanic Princess (1996-1998) - Japolo
Sol Bianca: The Legacy (1999-2000) - April

Theatrical animation
Metropolis (2001) (Female customer)
Piano no Mori (2007 (Daigaku Kanehira)
Roujin Z (1991) (Chie Satō)
Taiho Shichauzo the Movie (1999) (Aoi Futaba)
Hunter x Hunter (1998) (Gon Freecss)
Perfect Blue (1998) (Rumi)
Pocket Monsters films (1998-2020) (Satoshi)
Yu-Gi-Oh!: The Dark Side of Dimensions (Bakura) (2016)
DC Super Heroes vs. Eagle Talon (2017) (Wonder Woman)

Video games
GeGeGe no Kitarō: Gyakushū! Yōma Dai Kessen (2003) (Kitarō)
GeGeGe no Kitarō: Ibun Yōkai Kitan (2003) (Kitarō)
GeGeGe no Kitarō: Kikiippotsu! Yōkai Rettō (2003) (Kitarō)
Super Robot Wars Original Generations (2007, PlayStation 2) (Ricarla Borgnine)
Lunar 2: Eternal Blue (1994) (Nall)
Shinsetsu Samurai Spirits Bushido Retsuden (1997) (Rashojin Mizuki)
Haunted Junction (1997, PlayStation) - Asahina Mutsuki
Brave Fencer Musashi (1998) (Musashi)
Maria 2: Jutaikokuchi no Nazo (1999) (Maria Kunitoma)
Super Robot Wars Alpha (2000, PlayStation) (Ricarla Borgnine)
Kingdom Hearts II (2005) (Megara)
Mario Kart Arcade GP DX (2013) (Commentator)
Mobile Suit Gundam: Extreme Vs. Maxi Boost (2015) (Shiro Kyoda)
Mobile Suit Gundam: Extreme Vs. Maxi Boost ON (2016) (Shiro Kyoda)
Kingdom Hearts III (2019)  (Megara)
Pokémon Masters EX (2022) (Satoshi)

Tokusatsu
Kousoku Sentai Turboranger (1989) (Bell Chime Boma (ep. 27), Amulet Boma (ep. 31))
The Mobile Cop Jiban (1989) (Reporter (Actor) (ep. 9), Queen Cosmo (voice) (ep. 46))
Chikyuu Sentai Fiveman (1990) (Arthur G6)
Choujin Sentai Jetman (1991) (Trash Dimension (ep. 21))
Kyōryū Sentai Zyuranger (1992) (Dora Laygor (ep. 33))
Engine Sentai Go-onger (2008) (Savage Land Barbaric Machine Beast Bōseki Banki (ep. 22))
Unofficial Sentai Akibaranger (2012) (Masako "Miyabi" Yamada)

Dubbing roles

Live-action
Patricia Arquette
True Romance (Alabama Whitman)
Holy Matrimony (Havana)
Flirting with Disaster (Nancy Coplin)
Nightwatch (Katherine)
Bringing Out the Dead (Mary Burke)
Little Nicky (Valerie Veran)
Human Nature (Lila Jute)
Holes (Katherine "Kissin' Kate" Barlow)
Medium (Allison Dubois)
Boyhood (Olivia Evans)
CSI: Cyber (Avery Ryan)
Drew Barrymore
Bad Girls (1997 TV Asahi edition) (Lily Laronette)
Ever After (Danielle De Barbarac)
Never Been Kissed (Josie Geller)
Charlie's Angels (Dylan Sanders)
Riding in Cars with Boys (Beverly Ann "Bev" Donofrio)
Charlie's Angels: Full Throttle (Dylan Sanders)
50 First Dates (Lucy Whitmore)
Fever Pitch (Lindsey Meeks)
Renée Zellweger
A Price Above Rubies (Sonia Horowitz)
The Bachelor (Anne Arden)
Bridget Jones's Diary (Bridget Jones)
Chicago (Roxanne "Roxie" Hart)
Bridget Jones: The Edge of Reason (Bridget Jones)
Cinderella Man (Mae Braddock)
Leatherheads (Lexie Littleton)
Bridget Jones's Baby (Bridget Jones)
Sandra Bullock
Demolition Man (1997 TV Asahi edition) (Lieutenant Lenina Huxley)
Speed (1998 TV Asahi edition) (Annie Porter)
The Net (TV Asahi edition) (Angela Bennett)
Miss Congeniality (2005 NTV edition) (Gracie Hart)
Crash (Jean Cabot)
Miss Congeniality 2: Armed and Fabulous (2008 NTV edition) (Gracie Hart)
Reese Witherspoon
Pleasantville (Jennifer)
Little Nicky (Holly)
Legally Blonde (Elle Woods)
Sweet Home Alabama (Melanie "Carmichael" Smooter Perry)
Legally Blonde 2: Red, White & Blonde (Elle Woods)
This Means War (Lauren Scott)
Juliette Lewis
Cape Fear (Danielle Bowden)
The Basketball Diaries (Diane Moody)
From Dusk till Dawn (Kate Fuller)
The Way of the Gun (Robin)
All the Right Moves (1991 NTV edition) (Lisa Lietzke (Lea Thompson))
Armour of God II: Operation Condor (Elsa)
Beverly Hills, 90210 (Kelly Taylor (Jennie Garth))
BH90210 (Jennie Garth/Kelly Taylor)
Big Eyes (Margaret Keane (Amy Adams))
Bill & Ted's Bogus Journey (Elizabeth (Annette Azcuy))
Blue Velvet (1991 TV Tokyo edition) (Sandy Williams (Laura Dern))
Bram Stoker's Dracula (1995 TV Asahi edition) (Mina Harker (Winona Ryder))
Crank (Eve Lydon (Amy Smart))
Crank: High Voltage (Eve Lydon (Amy Smart))
Dinosaurs (Charlene Sinclair)
A Discovery of Witches (Sarah Bishop (Alex Kingston))
The Father (Anne (Olivia Colman))
Father of the Bride (Annie Banks (Kimberly Williams-Paisley))
Father of the Bride Part II (Annie Banks-Mackenzie (Kimberly Williams-Paisley))
The Fifth Element (Leeloo Minaï Lekatariba-Laminaï-Tchaï Ekbat de Sebat (Milla Jovovich))
Friday the 13th Part VIII: Jason Takes Manhattan (J.J. (Saffron Henderson))
Friends (Melissa Warburton (Winona Ryder))
Ghost Stories (Simon Rifkind (Alex Lawther))
The Gilded Age (Agnes van Rhijn (Christine Baranski))
He Got Game (Dakota Barns (Milla Jovovich))
Heartbreakers (Page Conners (Jennifer Love Hewitt))
The Huntsman: Winter's War (Bromwyn (Sheridan Smith))
Kindergarten Cop (Cindy (Alix Koromzay))
Kissing Jessica Stein (Helen Cooper (Heather Juergensen))
Little Voice (Laura Hoff / LV (Jane Horrocks))
Peaceful (Crystal (Catherine Deneuve))
Romeo Must Die (Trish O'Day (Aaliyah))
Secret Sunshine (Lee Shin-ae (Jeon Do-yeon))
Stealing Beauty (Lucy Harmon (Liv Tyler))
Ted (Norah Jones)
The Terminator (2003 TV Tokyo edition) (Sarah Connor (Linda Hamilton))
The War (Elvadine)
Thunderbolt (Amy Yip) (Anita Yuen)
Wrong Turn (Jessie Burlingame (Eliza Dushku))
Zoolander (Matilda Jeffries (Christine Taylor))

Animation
Deep (Deep)
Jack and the Cuckoo-Clock Heart (Madeleine #1)
The Road to El Dorado (Chel)
Terra Willy (Willy)
Trolls World Tour (Delta Dawn)

Discography

Albums

Other songs
"Get a Dream" (Opening of Sunrise Eiyuutan/Sunrise Eiyuutan R)
"Alive A life" (Opening for Kamen Rider Ryuki, Remix tracks of Rider Chips' Song Attack Ride Vol.1)
"Mezase Pokémon Masutā" (Opening for Pokémon: Original Series Chapter 1: Sekiei Rīgu)
"Mezase Pokémon Masutā '98" (Opening for Pokémon Movie 1: Myūtsū no Gyakushū)
"Mezase Pokémon Masutā 2001" (Opening for Pokémon Movie 4: Serebii Toki wo Koeta Deai)
"Mezase Pokémon Masutā 2002" (Opening for Pokémon Movie 5: Mizu no Miyako no Mamori Gami - Latias to Latios)
"Oyasumi, Boku no Pikachu" (from the Mezase Pokémon Masutā album)
"Pokémon Masutā e no Michi" (from the Pokémon Rocket Gang! It's a White Tomorrow! CD drama) sung with Naoki Takao
"Taipu: Wairudo" (Ending for Pokémon: Original Series Chapter 1: Sekiei Rīgu & Pokémon: Original Series Chapter 2: Orenji Shotō Hen)
"Raibaru!" (Opening for Pokémon: Original Series Chapter 2: Orenji Shotō Hen & for Pokémon Movie 2: Maboroshi no Pokémon: Lugia Bakutan)
"Minna de Aruko!" (from the Pokémon Rapurasu ni Notte album), sung with Ikue Ōtani, Mayumi Iizuka, Satomi Koorogi, Yūji Ueda, Rikako Aikawa, Tomokazu Seki, Mika Kanai & Megumi Hayashibara
"Minna ga Itakara" (Insert song for Pokémon Movie 2: Maboroshi no Pokémon: Lugia Bakutan) 
"OK!" (Opening for Pokémon: Original Series Chapter 3: Kin-Gin Hen)
"OK! 2000" (Opening for Pokémon Movie 3: Kesshou Tou no Teiou: Entei)
"Charenjā!" (Opening for Pokémon: Advanced Generation)
"Supāto!" (Opening for Pokémon: Advanced Generation)
"Hai Tatchi!" (Opening for Pokémon: Diamond and Pearl, sung with Megumi Toyoguchi)
"Hai Tatchi! 2009" (Opening song of Gekijouban Pocket Monsters Diamond and Pearl: Arceus Chōkoku no Jikū e, and Opening for Pokémon: Diamond and Pearl, sung with Megumi Toyoguchi)
"Burning Soul" (Hyuga Kojiro image song for the Captain Tsubasa: Road to 2002 Song Of Kickers CD)
"Chiisana Dai Bouken" (Opening for Chi's Sweet Home: Chi's New Address)
"Besuto Uisshu!" (Opening for Pokémon: Best Wishes!)
"In Your Heart" (From Ultraman Neos), sung with Project DMM
"Yajirushi ni Natte!" (Opening for Pokémon: Best Wishes! Season 2)
"Yajirushi ni Natte! 2013" (Opening for Pokémon: Best Wishes! Season 2 Episode N)
"V (Boruto)" (Alternate Version) (Opening for Pokémon XY, sung with Jewel (J☆Dee'Z))
"Getta Ban Ban" (Alternate Version) (Opening for Pokémon XY, sung with Ikue Ōtani)
"XY&Z (Ekkusu Wai & Zetto)" (Opening for Pokémon XY&Z)
"Arōra!!" (Opening for Pokémon Sun & Moon, sung with Ikue Ōtani)
"Mezase Pokémon Masutā 20th Anniversary" (Opening for Pokémon Sun & Moon and for Gekijō-ban Poketto Monsutā Kimi ni kimeta!)
"Mezase Pokémon Masutā 20th Anniversary Ballad ver."
"Oyasumi, Boku no Pikachu 2017 ver."
"Mezase Pokémon Masutā '98 (2019 Remaster)" (Opening for Myūtsū no Gyakushū EVOLUTION)
"Go! Now! ~Alive A life neo~" (Ending theme for Kamen Rider Zi-O Spinoff - Rider Time: Kamen Rider Ryuki)
"1・2・3" (Opening for Pokémon Journeys, sung with Daiki Yamashita)

References

External links
 
 
Rica Matsumoto at GamePlaza-Haruka Voice Acting Database 

1968 births
Living people
Anime singers
JAM Project members
Japanese contraltos
Japanese women pop singers
Japanese musical theatre actresses
Japanese video game actresses
Japanese voice actresses
Musicians from Kanagawa Prefecture
Voice actresses from Yokohama
20th-century Japanese actresses
21st-century Japanese actresses
20th-century Japanese women singers
20th-century Japanese singers
21st-century Japanese women singers
21st-century Japanese singers